Gabs or GABS may refer to:

Golden Arrow Bus Services, a bus company in Cape Town, South Africa
Gaborone, the capital and largest city of the Botswana nicknamed Gabs
Great Australasian Beer SpecTAPular, a craft beer festival commonly knows as GABS
Modibo Keita International Airport, Mali airport with IACO identifier GABS

See also
Gabès, a city in Tunisia
Gab (disambiguation)